Callum George Winchcombe (born 28 November 2003) is an English professional footballer who plays as a centre back for Isthmian League Premier Division Central club Basingstoke Town.

Career
Winchcombe joined Swindon Town from Procision Football Academy in 2015, and went on to make his first-team debut in November 2021 during an EFL Trophy group-stage tie against Newport County, playing the full 90 minutes in the 1–0 victory.

On 25 March 2022, Winchcombe and team-mate Levi Francis joined National League South club Chippenham Town on work experience loans for the remainder of the 2021–22 campaign.

On 24 July 2022, Winchcombe signed for Isthmian League Premier South Central Division club Basingstoke Town.

Career statistics

References

External links

2003 births
Living people
English footballers
Association football defenders
Swindon Town F.C. players
Chippenham Town F.C. players
Basingstoke Town F.C. players
National League (English football) players